Santiago Giraldo was the defending champion, but decided not to participate.
Paolo Lorenzi defeated Rogério Dutra da Silva 7–5, 6–2 in the final.

Seeds

Draw

Finals

Top half

Bottom half

References
 Main Draw
 Qualifying Draw

Seguros Bolivar Open Pereira - Singles
2011 Singles